This is a historical list of fastest computers and includes computers and supercomputers which were considered the fastest in the world at the time they were built.

a.  An asterisk (*) denotes Rmaxthe highest score measured using the LINPACK benchmarks suite.

See also
 History of supercomputing
 Timeline of instructions per second (IPS)
 TOP500 § Systems ranked No. 1 since 1976 (FLOPS)

References 

 Computer Speeds From Instruction Mixes (pre-1960 to 1971)
 TOP500 #1 systems since 1993 – TOP500.org

 
History of computing hardware
Fastest computers
Fastest computers